Several chromosome regions have been defined by convenience in order to talk about gene loci. Most important is the distinction between chromosome region p and chromosome region q.  The p region is represented in the shorter arm of the chromosome (p is for petit, French for small) while the q region is in the larger arm (chosen as next letter in alphabet after p). These are virtual regions that exist in all chromosomes.

These are listed as follows:

 Chromatids
 Arms
 Centromere
 Kinetochore
 Telomere
 Sub telomere
 satellite chromosome or trabant.
 NOR region

During cell division, the molecules that compose chromosomes (DNA and proteins) suffer a condensation process (called the chromatin reticulum condensation) that forms a compact and small complex called a chromatid. The complexes containing the duplicated DNA molecules, the sister chromatids, are attached to each other by the centromere(where the Kinetochore assembles).

If the chromosome is a submetacentric chromosome (One arm big and the other arm small) then the centromere divides each chromosome into two regions: the smaller one, which is the p region, and the bigger one, the q region. The sister chromatids will be distributed to each daughter cell at the end of the cell division. Whereas if the chromosome is isobrachial (centromere at  centre and arms of equal length), the p and q system is meaningless.

At either end of a chromosome is a telomere, a cap of DNA that protects the rest of the chromosome from damage. The telomere has repetitive junk DNA and hence any enzymatic damage will not affect the coded regions. The areas of the p and q regions close to the telomeres are the subtelomeres, or subtelomeric regions. The areas closer to the centromere are the pericentronomic regions. Finally, the interstitial regions are the parts of the p and q regions that are close to neither the centromere nor the telomeres, but are roughly in the middle of p or q.

See also
Satellite chromosome

References

Chromosomes